The Denis classification is a system of categorizing sacral fractures.

Classification

References

Pelvic fracture classifications
Injuries of abdomen, lower back, lumbar spine and pelvis